Joseph Velly (10 March 1938 – 29 September 2016) was a French racing cyclist. He rode in the 1962 Tour de France.

References

External links
 

1938 births
2016 deaths
French male cyclists